Karen J. Clark (born July 23, 1945) is an American politician and former member of the Minnesota House of Representatives. A member of the Minnesota Democratic–Farmer–Labor Party (DFL), she represented District 62A, which included portions of the city of Minneapolis in the Twin Cities metropolitan area including portions of the Whittier, Phillips, Ventura Village, Seward, and Lyn-Lake neighborhoods. She was the longest serving openly lesbian member to serve in a state legislature in the United States. On December 8, 2017, Clark announced in a press release that she would not be running for reelection.

Early life, education, and career
Raised on a farm in southwestern Minnesota, Clark attended public schools in Edgerton, graduating from Edgerton High School in 1963. She earned her B.S. in nursing at the College of Saint Teresa in Winona. She later attended the John F. Kennedy School of Government at Harvard University in Cambridge, Massachusetts, earning her Master of Public Administration degree in 1996.

Clark has been an instructor at the University of Minnesota since 1985. She previously worked as public health nurse, VISTA nurse-organizer and an OB-GYN Nurse Practitioner. 
She is a member of the adjunct Faculty of the Department of Human Relations at St. Cloud State University, of the University of Minnesota's Women's Studies Department, of the Macalester College Women's Studies Department, and of the College of St. Catherine Graduate School of Holistic Health. She is a member of AFSCME.

Minnesota House of Representatives
Clark was first elected in 1980 and was re-elected every two years until retiring in 2018.

She has chaired the Governmental Operations Subcommittee for Jobs Creation and Unemployment Issues, the Economic Development and Housing Subcommittee for Job Development and Training, the Economic Development Subcommittee for the Community Stabilization and Development Division, the Housing Committee, the  
Economic Development and International Trade Subcommittee for the Housing and Housing Finance Division, and the Finance Subcommittee for the Housing Policy and Finance and Public Health Finance Division.

Personal life
She is active in numerous South Minneapolis neighborhoods focusing on issues relating to housing, health, human-rights, labor, women's rights, peace, and affordable high-quality child care for all.

Political career

Advocacy for LGBT rights
Clark is a lesbian, and was one of three openly gay members of the Minnesota Legislature, along with Senator D. Scott Dibble and Rep. Susan Allen, both Minneapolis Democrats. After the Minnesota House voted on May 21, 2011, to place a gay marriage amendment referendum on the ballot in the 2012 general election, she and Dibble released a joint statement condemning the referendum. The referendum had voters decide whether a legal marriage was defined as between one man and one woman.

Following the May 2011 House vote on the gay marriage amendment referendum, Clark stated: "It’s a sad day for the State of Minnesota. Tonight, we’ve moved one step closer to discriminating against Minnesotans simply based on who they love. This amendment won’t help a single family in Minnesota, and this vote is absolutely heartbreaking to thousands of people and families across our state. History will not look back kindly on this day or the people who voted for discrimination. The Minnesota I know is a place of inclusion, tolerance and love, and I truly believe the people of this great state will not vote to enshrine discrimination in our constitution..."

In 2013, after voters voted against the amendment, Clark was the House sponsor of an effort to legalize same-sex marriage. The act passed the House 75–59, as well as the Senate, and was later signed into law by Governor Mark Dayton. It took effect on July 1, 2013. (See also Same-sex marriage in Minnesota.)

In 1993, Clark played a critical role alongside Senator Allan Spear in passing an amendment to the Minnesota Human Rights Act that banned LGBT discrimination in housing, employment, and education.

Environmental Advocacy 
Clark has been in vocal in supporting protesters at Standing Rock who were part of the Dakota Access Pipeline Protests. On October 28, 2016, Clark read a speech urging Hennepin County Sheriff, Richard Stanek to withdraw deputies from Standing Rock.

Illegal Immigrant Rights 
On May 25, 2017, Clark engaged in a hunger strike to show solidarity with protesters of a proposed public safety bill that would limit undocumented immigrants' ability to obtain driver's licenses.

References

External links

 Rep. Clark Campaign Web Site

1945 births
Living people
People from Fort Sill, Oklahoma
Politicians from Minneapolis
Democratic Party members of the Minnesota House of Representatives
Lesbian politicians
LGBT state legislators in Minnesota
Harvard Kennedy School alumni
University of Minnesota faculty
Women state legislators in Minnesota
21st-century American politicians
21st-century American women politicians
People from Pipestone County, Minnesota
American women academics